The 2022 Lamar Hunt U.S. Open Cup was the 107th edition of the U.S. Open Cup, a knockout cup competition in American soccer. After the 2020 and 2021 competitions were suspended and ultimately canceled due to the COVID-19 pandemic, the United States Soccer Federation announced that the 2022 edition would run from March to mid-September of that year. The 2022 field features 103 clubs, 71 of them fully professional—both modern-era records.

On December 22, 2021, U.S. Soccer announced the final format for the 2022 tournament, with two major changes from prior editions. First, all eligible Division II and Division III professional teams will enter in the Second Round. Second, Major League Soccer will have its entry staggered: Seventeen MLS teams will enter in the Third Round, and the remaining eight teams (the four playing in the 2022 CONCACAF Champions League, and the next highest two teams in both the Eastern and Western Conferences) will enter in the Round of 32.

For the first time since 2017, multiple leagues from the same division competed in the Open Cup. USL League One, of Division III, competed alongside teams from MLS Next Pro and the National Independent Soccer Association (NISA). NISA was set to make its Open Cup debut in 2020, before that tournament was canceled; MLS Next Pro was established in 2021, and while primarily a developmental league for MLS teams, its independent clubs are eligible for the Open Cup.

Atlanta United FC were the defending champions, having won the 2019 tournament, but were eliminated in the Round of 32 by Nashville SC.

Orlando City SC won their first Open Cup title, defeating Sacramento Republic FC 3–0 in the final.

Schedule

Teams

Pro teams that are majority-owned or controlled by higher division professional clubs are barred from entering the competition. For this edition of the tournament, there are 21 such teams: Atlanta United 2 (USLC), LA Galaxy II (USLC), Loudoun United FC (USLC), New York Red Bulls II (USLC), and 17 out of 19 MLS Next Pro teams. The two MLS Next Pro teams entering are Rochester New York FC (independent club) and St. Louis City SC 2 (the club's senior team does not debut until the 2023 season).

Table

 Bold denotes team is still active in the tournament.
  $: Winner of $25,000 bonus for advancing the furthest in the competition from their respective divisions. 
  $$: Winner of $100,000 for being the runner-up in the competition.
  $$$: Winner of $300,000 for winning the competition.

Map

Number of teams by state
A total of 35 states and the District of Columbia are represented by clubs in the U.S. Open Cup this year.

States without a team in the Open Cup: Alaska, Arkansas, Delaware, Hawaii, Idaho, Louisiana, Maine, Montana, New Hampshire, North Dakota, Rhode Island, South Dakota, Vermont, West Virginia, and Wyoming.

Open Cup debuts

31 teams will be playing in their first Open Cup tournament in 2022.

 MLS: Austin FC, Charlotte FC, Inter Miami CF
 USLC: Monterey Bay FC, Oakland Roots SC, Rio Grande Valley FC Toros, San Diego Loyal SC
 MLS Next Pro: St. Louis City SC 2
 NISA: Albion San Diego, AC Syracuse Pulse, Bay Cities FC, California United Strikers FC, Flower City Union, Los Angeles Force, Maryland Bobcats FC, Michigan Stars FC, Valley United FC
 USL1: Central Valley Fuego FC, Northern Colorado Hailstorm FC, Union Omaha
 NPSL: Cleveland SC, Denton Diablos FC, Southern States Soccer Club, Las Vegas Legends
 USL2: Minneapolis City SC, Park City Red Wolves SC
 UPSL: Escondido FC, Lynchburg FC, Oyster Bay United FC, San Fernando Valley FC
 Other Open Division: Brockton FC United, D'Feeters Kicks SC

Format

Draws

No team who was playing their first Open Cup match was paired with another team also playing their first Open Cup match. An exception was made if there were no other teams that were geographically close in order to prevent excess travel.
 Random pairings were done in cases where three or more teams were from the same general area.
 In cases where a geographical fit didn't exist, a random selection occurred.
 Pairings between clubs and their parent clubs, clubs with shared ownership, or other clubs using the same technical resources was avoided in geographic selections and random pairings until the final. For 2022, these pairings included: Los Angeles FC (MLS) and Las Vegas Lights (USLC), Portland Timbers (MLS) and Portland Timbers U23 (USL2), Chattanooga Red Wolves SC (USL1) and Park City Red Wolves SC (USL2).

Matches

 Single-game-knockout format with two 45-minute halves and stoppage time.
 Tied matches are sent to two 15-minute extra-time halves with stoppage time.
 Matches tied after extra time will be settled with a penalty shootout.
 Home teams are determined by a random selection among teams that apply to host. Teams that meet minimum tournament standards will be given priority over others in their pairing.
 Five substitutions during regulation time over three substitution windows and halftime.
 One extra substitution added during extra time. This substitution can be made at the end of regulation, over an additional substitution window, or at extra-time halftime.
 Up to two extra substitutions over two extra substitution windows will be available in the case of a concussion. If a team uses this concussion substitution, the opposing team gains an additional substitution and substitution window.

First and Second rounds

In the First round, teams (local, National Amateur Cup, NPSL, & USL2) were paired in a geographical manner, pitting teams closer together against each other. Once the First round pairings were made those pairings were matched with a Division II (USLC) or a Division III (MLS Next Pro, NISA, or USL1) team in a geographical manner for the Second round. Division II & III teams that remained unmatched were matched together, again geographically, avoiding any same-division matching (e.g., no II vs II or III vs III).

The complete draw for the First round, including match dates and times, was announced on February 2, 2022. Draws for the Second round were announced on February 11; match dates and times were announced on February 28.

Bracket

Host team listed first
Bold = winner
* = after extra time, = penalty shootout score

First round

All times local to game site.

Second round
All times local to game site.

Third round

The winners of the second round and the new entrants to the tournament were grouped geographically into groups of four (12 groups) or six (eight groups), depending on the distribution of teams after the Second Round. Division I (MLS) teams entering the tournament were spread among the groups as evenly as possible (groups of four: five groups with two and seven groups with one MLS team; groups of six: one group with three and seven groups with two MLS teams). All MLS teams faced a lower-division team. Random selection for each group determined the pairs. Instances where geographical fit didn't exist when creating groups was resolved by random selection.

All times local to game site.

Round of 32

The winners of the Third Round and the new entrants to the tournament were grouped geographically into groups of four (eight groups). Each group had one of the MLS teams entering this round. Random selection for each group determined the pairs. Instances where geographical fit didn't exist when creating groups was resolved by random selection. The draw for the Round of 32 took place on April 21.

All times local to game site.

Round of 16 and Quarter-finals

The winners of the Round of 32 were grouped geographically into groups of four (four groups). Random selection for each group determined the pairs. The Round of 16/Quarter-final draw took place on May 12 at 8:30 PM EDT on Futbol Americas on ESPN+.

Bold = winner
* = after extra time, = penalty shoot-out score

Round of 16
All times local to game site.

Quarter-finals
All times local to game site.

Semi-finals and Final

The Quarter-final winners were matched geographically to determine the pairings for the semi-final round. The draw to determine the home teams for the semi-finals and the final was held on June 23.

Semi-finals
All times local to game site.

Final

Top goal scorers

Broadcasting
First Round matches were split between ESPN+ and U.S. Soccer's YouTube channel; all matches from the Second Round to the final will be broadcast on ESPN+. This is the final year of a four-year agreement between ESPN and U.S. Soccer to broadcast the tournament. Warner Bros. Discovery Sports will have the rights starting in 2023, as part of an 8-year agreement with U.S. Soccer.

References

 
U.S. Open Cup
2022 in American soccer
2022 North American domestic association football cups
2022 domestic association football cups